Redcliff Nunatak is a red granite nunatak, 630 m, rising about 4 nautical miles (7 km) east of Mount Suess along the south flank of Mackay Glacier, in Victoria Land. Charted by the British Antarctic Expedition, 1910–13, and so named because of its color.

References

Nunataks of Victoria Land
Scott Coast